Finn Rosanna Atkins (born 21 June 1989) is a British film, television and stage actress.

Early life
Atkins was born in Nottingham and grew up in the Clifton area, where she attended Greencroft Primary School, Farnborough School and High Pavement College. She has been a member of  the Television Workshop since she was at primary school.

Career
Atkins' breakthrough came early, in Shane Meadows' 2002 film Once Upon a Time in the Midlands, in which she played Marlene, the daughter of Shirley (Shirley Henderson) and Jimmy (Robert Carlyle). Although opinions on the film were divided, everyone seemed to agree about Atkins' contribution. In The Guardian, Peter Bradshaw wrote of the film: "there is a cracking turn from Finn Atkins as Shirley's daughter… a bouquet is due." Whilst The Telegraph'''s Sukhdev Sandhu exclaimed: "Finn Atkins is superb as Shirley Henderson's whey-faced daughter."

In January 2009 she appeared as teenage prostitute Marissa in the BBC One soap opera EastEnders. She has since become a regular in Sky1's hit comedy drama 'Starlings' where she plays Charlie Starling; the football mad daughter to Jan & Terry Starling (Lesley Sharp & Brendan Coyle).

Filmography

FilmBale (2009) aka Haybales — Kelly; Elephant Gun Films Limited (director: Alastair Mackay)Eden Lake (2008) — Paige; Celador Films (director: James Watkins)This Is England (2006) — Skinhead Girl; Warp Films (director: Shane Meadows)Once Upon a Time in the Midlands (2002) — Marlene; Midlands Films (director: Shane Meadows)Better or Worse? (2000) — Rachel; Lifesize Pictures (director: Jocelyn Cammack)To Walk  Invisible - The Brontë Sisters (2016) Charlotte Brontë (director: Sally Wainwright)

TelevisionTo Walk Invisible (one off drama) … Charlotte Brontë 29 December 2016Starlings … Charlie in all 8 episodes; 13 May - 1 July 2012, Sky OneMoving On … Stacy in "Butterfly Effect" (#1.5); 22 May 2009, BBC OneEastEnders … Marissa in eight episodes; 13–29 January 2009, BBC OneCasualty … Sammy Malone in three episodes:
"The Line of Fire" (#23.9); 1 November 2008, BBC One
"Farmead Menace: Part 2" (#23.2); 14 September 2008, BBC One
"Farmead Menace: Part 1" (#23.1); 13 September 2008, BBC OneDoctors … three episodes:
"The Fires of Midwinter" ... Sophie Wakefield; 7 January 2014, BBC One
"The Hex"  … Penny Harvey; 24 April 2008, BBC One
"Iron Man" … Gill Davies; 13 June 2005, BBC OneHolby City … Pheona Allen in "Looking After Number One"(#8.39); 25 July 2006, BBC OneDown to Earth … Kate Cooper in unknown episodes; 2005, BBC OneState of Play … Kelvin Stagg's Girlfriend in one episode (#1.1); 18 May 2003, BBC OneDangerville … Finn in ten episodes; 7 January – 25 March 2003, ITV1Peak Practice … Sarah Lloyd in two episodes:
"Hit and Run" (#10.2); 12 September 2000, ITV1
"For Love of the Child" (#10.1); 5 September 2000, ITV1

TheatreWe Happy Few … Gertrude; Nottingham Arts Centre, 25–28 February 2009 (author: Imogen Stubbs; director: Ian Smith)Who is Jesse Flood … Carlton Junior Television Workshop (director: Alison Rashley)Measure for Measure … Nottingham Galleries of Justice (director: Ian Smith)

Music VideosRichard Hawley ... Tonight The Streets Are Ours (2007)

References

External links

Talent Agency KenMcReddie.com''

1989 births
Living people
British film actresses
British stage actresses
British television actresses
People from Nottingham
Actresses from Nottinghamshire